Camas Prairie Railroad Company  was a short line railroad in northern Idaho jointly owned and operated by Northern Pacific Railway and Union Pacific. The Camas Prairie Railroad was known as the "railroad on stilts" due to the many wooden trestles along its route.

Parts of the former railroad are now operated by the Great Northwest Railroad and the BG&CM Railroad.

History
The Nez Perce Indian Reservation was opened to white settlement in  By the turn of the 20th century, Edward H. Harriman and James J. Hill were engaged in a "railroad war" for control of rail routes through this area to reach the  Despite their competing interests, the railroad barons co-operated to build the Camas Prairie Railroad.

The Camas Prairie Railroad was known as the "railroad on stilts" due to the many wooden trestles along its route. In one  stretch, there were more than a dozen trestles.

Bridge 38 spans Lawyer's Canyon, between Craigmont and Ferdinand, and is visible from U.S. Route 95.

Nezperce & Idaho Railroad
The Nezperce & Idaho Railroad (reporting mark NP&I) was an independently owned short line railroad that connected the community of Nezperce to the Camas Prairie Railroad. Primarily used to ship agricultural products it operated from 1910 until 1975, it was then used for boxcar storage until the 1980s.

Demise 
The railroad was sold to North American RailNet in April 1998, and it became the subsidiary Camas Prairie RailNet, Inc. (CSPR). After less than two years, CSPR notified the U.S. government in late 1999 that the second subdivision line to Grangeville could be subject to abandonment, citing lack of profitability. It made its formal request in May, and it was approved by the Surface Transportation Board in September 2000; the last run to Fenn and Grangeville was on  The tracks were to be removed shortly thereafter, but that was delayed as a new operator for the line was sought.When BG&CM stepped in to operate the second subdivision line in December 2002, it was originally only to extend from Spalding to Craigmont, but a few weeks later decided to continue south, across Lawyer's Canyon to Cottonwood, stopping the salvage crews from going further north.

The tracks from Cottonwood to Grangeville were removed and salvaged in late 2002 and 2003. North American RailNet sold the remainder of the railroad to Watco in March 2004, which renamed it the Great Northwest Railroad.

In 2011, Bridge 21-3 was destroyed in a wildfire. Although BG&CM owner Mike Williams indicated plans to rebuild by spring of 2012 at the latest, no construction has occurred. 

By 2021 the tracks had been removed all the way from Grangeville to Ruebens.

Second subdivision
All locations in north central Idaho

Source:

Passenger service
Passenger service on the main line along the Clearwater River to Stites and on the second subdivision to Grangeville was discontinued  in August 1955.

Popular culture
The 1975 film Breakheart Pass starring Charles Bronson was filmed on portions of the railroad, as were parts of 1999's Wild Wild West.

References

External links

American-rails.com – Camas Prairie Railroad
Camas Prairie Rails

Preservation Idaho – Camas Prairie Railroad
University of Idaho Library: Digital Initiatives – Hal Riegger CPRR Collection

Defunct Idaho railroads
Defunct Washington (state) railroads
Historic American Engineering Record in Idaho
Spin-offs of the Northern Pacific Railway
Spin-offs of the Union Pacific Railroad
Transportation in Nez Perce County, Idaho
Transportation in Lewis County, Idaho
Transportation in Idaho County, Idaho